Cristian Pațurcă (10 September 1964 – 18 January 2011) was a Romanian composer.

Pațurcă was born and died in Bucharest. He was the composer of a song called (Imnul Golanilor – The Hooligans’ Hymn) that inspired Romanians in their struggle against vestiges of the Communist government.

Awards
The President of Romania at that time, Traian Băsescu, awarded Pațurcă the National Order of Faithful Service in April 2010, 20 years after he composed the song.

Death
Pațurcă died on 18 January 2011 at the age of 46, after a long battle with tuberculosis and long-term liver problems.

See also
Golaniad

References

External links

obituary on Linkiesta.it

1964 births
2011 deaths
Musicians from Bucharest
Romanian composers
21st-century deaths from tuberculosis
Burials at Bellu Cemetery
Tuberculosis deaths in Romania
Deaths from liver disease
Recipients of the National Order of Faithful Service
Romanian anti-communists